Metropolitan Missionary Baptist Church, originally named the Third Church of Christ, Scientist, is a landmark church located on West Washington Boulevard in Chicago, Illinois, United States. The church was designed by architect Hugh M.G. Garden and was built in 1901. The church was sold to its current owners in 1947. It was designated a Chicago Landmark on February 16, 1989, and was listed on the National Register of Historic Places in 2016.

See also
National Register of Historic Places listings in West Side Chicago

Notes

External links

Churches completed in 1901
20th-century Baptist churches in the United States
Churches in Chicago
Former Christian Science churches, societies and buildings in Illinois
National Register of Historic Places in Chicago
Churches on the National Register of Historic Places in Illinois
Chicago Landmarks